Methyloterrigena soli is a Gram-negative, aerobic, short rod-shaped, methanol-utilizing and motile bacteria from the family of Methyloterrigena which has been isolated from soil.

References

External links
Type strain of Methyloterrigena soli at BacDive -  the Bacterial Diversity Metadatabase

Hyphomicrobiales
Bacteria described in 2016